The University Institute of Technology of Vélizy (UIT of Vélizy) is one of the French University Institutes of Technology.

It is part of Versailles Saint-Quentin-en-Yvelines University and located at Vélizy-Villacoublay.

It trains technicians in two or three years after the Baccalaureate.

It allows the preparation of a two-year undergraduate technical diploma called a Diplôme universitaire de technologie (DUT) and a three-year undergraduate technical diploma called a Licence professionnelle (professional Bachelor).

History 
The UIT of Vélizy was created in September 1991 as a component of the Versailles Saint-Quentin-en-Yvelines University.

Faculties 
This UIT has seven faculties located on two campuses :
 Vélizy-Villacoublay : Electrical Engineering and Computer Science, Computers - option Computer Engineering, Telecommunications and  Networks, Services and Communication Networks.
 Rambouillet : Chemical Engineering - Process Engineering - Bioprocess option, Administration and Commercial management, Marketing Techniques

References

Versailles Saint-Quentin-en-Yvelines University
Technical universities and colleges in France
Educational institutions established in 1991
Universities and colleges in Saint-Quentin-en-Yvelines
1991 establishments in France